Arkansas Highway 62 may refer to:
Arkansas Highway 62 (1926), now numbered 34 and 90
U.S. Route 62 in Arkansas, created ca. 1930